Eilish McSorley (born 24 April 1993) is a Scottish professional footballer who plays as a defender or midfielder for Glasgow City in the Scottish Women's Premier League and the Scotland women's national team.

Club career
Between the age of six and twelve McSorley played for Girvan Boys' Club. Before moving on to Ayr United GFC under-17's and then Kilmarnock LFC under-17. She joined Glasgow City in August 2008, and was promoted from the reserves into the first team for City's UEFA Women's Champions League campaign in 2009.

McSorley helped Glasgow City reach the quarter-finals of the 2014–15 UEFA Women's Champions League but elected to join Swedish Damallsvenskan side Mallbackens IF in January 2015 on a one-year professional contract. She made 19 league appearances in the 2015 season as Mallbackens narrowly avoided relegation. Happy with life in Sweden, she agreed to remain with the club despite suffering an ankle injury.

The injury proved to be serious and McSorley was out of football until she returned to Glasgow City in September 2017. She returned to Sweden to play for Västerås BK30 in the first half of the Elitettan season, before joining Italian Serie A club Sassuolo in July 2018.

International career

Having progressed through the Scotland age group sides from under-16 upwards, McSorley made her debut for the full Scotland national side against Cameroon in a July 2012 challenge match.

McSorley's protracted injury ruled her out of consideration for Scotland's UEFA Women's Euro 2017 squad, although she had played in the early qualifiers.

Personal life
McSorley is a Celtic F.C. supporter.

References

External links 

Eilish McSorley at the Scottish FA
Eilish McSorley, at Glasgow City Ladies FC
Eilish McSorley, at Swedish Football Association 

Scottish women's footballers
Scotland women's international footballers
Living people
1993 births
People from Girvan
Glasgow City F.C. players
Damallsvenskan players
Scottish expatriate women's footballers
Mallbackens IF players
Scottish expatriate sportspeople in Sweden
Scottish expatriate sportspeople in Italy
Expatriate women's footballers in Sweden
Expatriate women's footballers in Italy
Women's association football central defenders
U.S. Sassuolo Calcio (women) players
Serie A (women's football) players
Footballers from South Ayrshire